Sathien Setthasit is a Thai billionaire. He made his fortune from Carabao Energy Drink, which he co-founded in 2002 with Aed Carabao. He resides primarily in Bangkok.

References

Sathien Setthasit
Living people
Year of birth missing (living people)
Place of birth missing (living people)